Potoci is a village in the municipality of Drvar, Bosnia and Herzegovina.

Demographics 
According to the 2013 census, its population was 41 in the Republika Srpska part and nil in the Federation of Bosnia and Herzegovina part.

References

Populated places in Istočni Drvar